Smart Approaches to Marijuana (SAM, Inc.) is a political organization opposed to marijuana legalization and commercialization. SAM describes itself as a bi-partisan partnership that works with local, state, and federal legislators to create policies that decrease marijuana use. SAM advocates for civil penalties for marijuana use (what some call decriminalization), along with mandated treatment, prevention, education, and awareness.

History and background
SAM was founded in 2013, by former Congressman Patrick Kennedy (D-Rhode Island), former White House drug policy adviser Kevin Sabet, senior editor of The Atlantic, David Frum and a group of health professionals in response to the successful 2012 marijuana legalization initiatives in Colorado and Washington.

The group states they have four priorities:
 Prevent Big Marijuana. SAM endeavors to prevent the formation of 'Big Marijuana', a potential commercial marijuana industry. SAM also seeks to prevent Big Tobacco from expanding its influence into Big Marijuana.
 Educate. SAM works to inform the public and policymakers about what the group considers to be "the science of today's marijuana."
 Reduce consequences. SAM aspires to open a dialogue about reducing civil and criminal penalties for marijuana offenders.
 Medical research. SAM aims to encourage medical marijuana research and promote the development of FDA-approved marijuana medications.

In 2013, the organization was endorsed by former president Jimmy Carter, who stated "I'm very proud of Patrick Kennedy and his Project SAM, Smart Approaches to Marijuana". "I wish him and Kevin Sabet every success in your independent project to make sure marijuana is handled responsibly." Despite this, Carter has expressed support for marijuana legalization.

Prior to 2020, SAM led several successful efforts to defeat marijuana legalization measures in Ohio (2015), Arizona (2016) and North Dakota (2018). SAM's opposition to marijuana legalization has been less successful since the 2020 elections, which resulted in four marijuana legalization measures being approved in Arizona, Montana, New Jersey, and South Dakota; SAM opposed all four and failed to prevent commercial marijuana sales from being legalized in Vermont shortly before the election. The following year, legislatures in New York, New Mexico and Virginia moved forward with cannabis legalization despite the vocal opposition of both Kevin Sabet and his organization. Commenting on the diminishing support for his cause, Kevin Sabet stated that marijuana's opponents were still extant but that many had "gone underground" in response to bipartisan support for legalization.

Issues

Criminal penalties for use
SAM supports removing criminal penalties for use, advocating instead for mandatory treatment. The group however do advocate for civil fines or penalties.

Medicinal marijuana products
Project SAM supports the study of the components of marijuana. The organization promotes research on marijuana in order to obtain FDA-approved, pharmacy-dispensed, cannabis-based medications.

Funding
SAM says it is mostly funded by small donors, and by grants. Sabet has stated none of the organization's funding comes from corporations or opiate manufacturers.  At least one donor, a private art collector dedicated to assisting substance abuse non-profits, gave $1,364,000 to SAM Action in 2016.

Media and activism
SAM Action, Inc. is the 501(c)(4) sister organization of SAM.

State and local chapters
SAM has affiliated organizations in 50 states that work to support its mission at the state level. In addition to its network of state affiliates, SAM has partnered with Arizonans for Responsible Drug Policy, the California Coalition for Responsible Drug Policies, Mainers for Healthy Youth, the Campaign for a Safe and Healthy Massachusetts, and Nevadans for Responsible Drug Policy.

    Alabama
    Alaska
    Arizona
    California
    Colorado
    Connecticut
    Georgia
    Hawaii
    Iowa
    Kansas
    Maine
    Maryland
    Massachusetts
    Minnesota
    Mississippi
    Nebraska
    Nevada
    New Hampshire
    New Jersey
    New York
    North Carolina
    Oregon
    Rhode Island
    Utah
    Vermont
    Virginia
    Washington

International branches

Smart Approaches to Marijuana Canada (SAMC) 
Smart Approaches to Marijuana New Zealand (Say Nope to Dope)

See also
 Arguments for and against drug prohibition
 Decriminalization of marijuana in the United States

References

Organizations established in 2013
2013 in cannabis
Cannabis organizations
Cannabis law reform organizations based in the United States
Cannabis law reform in the United States
Cannabis prohibition
Drug policy organizations based in the United States
Drug policy of the United States
Civic and political organizations of the United States
Political advocacy groups in the United States
Non-profit organizations based in Washington, D.C.
Opposition to cannabis legalization